Thaw or THAW may refer to:
 Thawing or melting
 Thaw (weather), the melting of snow and ice

Film and television
 The Thaw (1931 film), a Soviet film
 The Thaw (2009 film), an American horror film starring Val Kilmer
 "The Thaw" (Star Trek: Voyager), a 1996 episode of Star Trek Voyager
 The Thaw (TV series), a Russian television series  2013
 Zagar Pyaw Thaw Athe Hnalone, a 1968 Burmese black & white drama film

Geography
 River Thaw, a river in south Wales, United Kingdom
 Thaw Hill, a cinder cone in British Columbia, Canada
 Thaw lake, a lake formed in a thermokarst

Literature
 The Thaw (novel), a 1954 novel by Ilya Ehrenburg
 The Thaw (novelette), a 1979 novelette by Tanith Lee

Music
 Thaw (Foetus album) (1988)
 Thaw, a 2014 album by Buckethead

Political developments
 Cuban thaw, warming of Cuba–United States relations that began in 2014
 Gomułka thaw, Polish thaw or Polish October, a political change in Poland in 1956
 Khrushchev Thaw, a period in the history of the Soviet Union from the mid-1950s to the mid-1960s

Other uses
 Theaters Against War, a coalition of theaters and theater artists protesting against the Iraq war
 The Heat and Warmth Fund, a nonprofit organization in Michigan providing energy assistance
 Thaw Hall, historic academic building at the University of Pittsburgh, United States
 "The Thaw Session", a jam session by the English rock band The Verve

People

Surname
 Alan Thaw (1926–2007), Australian rules footballer
 Alice Cornelia Thaw (1880–1955), American philanthropist (daughter of William Thaw Sr. and Mary Sibbet Copley)
 Abigail Thaw (born 1965), British actress (daughter of John Thaw)
 Benjamin Thaw Sr. (1859–1933), American banker and philanthropist (son of William Thaw Sr., father of William Thaw II)
 Eugene V. Thaw (1927-2018), American art dealer and collector
 Evelyn Nesbit ( 1884–1967), also known as Evelyn Nesbit Thaw, artists' model and actress (married Harry Kendall Thaw 1905, div. 1915, mother of Russell Thaw)
 Florence Thaw (1864–1940), American painter
 Harry Kendall Thaw (1871–1947), American heir found not guilty of murder by reason of insanity (son of William Thaw Sr. and Mary Sibbet Copley, husband of Evelyn Nesbit, father of Russell Thaw)
 John Thaw (1942–2002), English actor (father of Abigail Thaw)
 Kevin Thaw (born 1967), English alpinist
 Margaret Copley Thaw (1877–1942), American philanthropist (daughter of William Thaw Sr. and Mary Sibbet Copley)
 Mary Sibbet Copley (1943–1929), also known as Mary Sibbet Copley Thaw, American philanthropist (second wife of William Thaw Sr., mother of Alice Cornelia Thaw, Margaret Copley Thaw, and Harry Kendall Thaw)
 Russell Thaw (1910–1984), American racing pilot (son of Harry Kendall Thaw and Evelyn Nesbit)
 William Thaw Sr. (1818–1889), American railroad baron (husband of Mary Sibbet Copley, father of Alice Cornelia Thaw, Benjamin Thaw, Harry Kendall Thaw, and Margaret Copley Thaw)
 William Thaw II (1893–1934), American aviator who fought in World War I

Burmese names
 Aung Thaw (born  1920), Burmese archaeologist
 Baganset U Thaw (1893–1980), Burmese businessman, trader, administrator, and politician
 Maung Thaw Ka, pen name of author and retired Major Ba Thaw
 May Barani Thaw (born 1990), Burmese super model, actress and beauty pageant titleholder who was crowned Miss Universe
 Mya Thaw (born 1955), Burmese dental professor (father of Zayar Thaw)
 Nyein Thaw (born 1993), Burmese actor and model
 San Thaw Thaw (born 2001), Burmese footballer
 Thaw Kaung, Burmese university librarian
 Zayar Thaw (1981–2022), Burmese politician, hip-hop artist, and political activist (son of Mya Thaw)

See also
 Thor (disambiguation)